Kitson may refer to:

People with the surname Kitson:
 Kitson (surname)

Other
 Kitsonville, West Virginia, an unincorporated community, United States
 Kitson & Co., locomotive builders
 Kitson Meyer, an articulated locomotive
 Kitson (store), fashion boutique with stores in Los Angeles, California, United States

See also
 Kittson (disambiguation)